Kestie Morassi (born 9 August 1978) is an Australian film and television actress.  She played Natalie in the TV series Satisfaction (2007). Morassi has also appeared in the films Dirty Deeds (2002), Wolf Creek (2005), The Illustrated Family Doctor (2005), and has made television appearances on Underbelly (2008), Wilfred (2010) and Black Snow (2022)

Early life
Morassi was born in Adelaide, South Australia. She lived in Adelaide until she was thirteen years old. She studied at the National Theatre, Melbourne Drama School, graduating in 1994, and another five years at Drama with a Difference where she later became a full time teacher for the school.

Career
Morassi first appeared on the television series Neighbours in 1996. She would later appear in BeastMaster, Stingers and The Secret Life of Us in the early 2000s before making the transition to films in 2002 alongside an all-star cast including Bryan Brown, Toni Collette, Sam Neill, Sam Worthington, and John Goodman in Dirty Deeds which saw her nominated for a Best Supporting Actor award by the Film Critics Circle of Australia.
   
Morassi has also appeared in Darkness Falls, Travelling Light, Strange Bedfellows, Thunderstruck, The Illustrated Family Doctor, and Josh Jarman before getting her international break in the Australian box-office success Wolf Creek, which screened at the 2005 Sundance Film Festival. She played backpacker Kristy Earl, for which she was nominated for an Australian Film Institute award for Best Supporting Actress 2005. She also starred in the Patrick Hughes short film Signs for Schweppes opposite Nick Russell.

In recent work, Morassi played whip-cracking brothel manager Natalie in Foxtel's groundbreaking drama Satisfaction and portrays sultry and infatuated criminal defence lawyer Zarah Garde-Wilson in the Nine Network TV drama series Underbelly.  In 2010, she had a guest appearance on Wilfred, playing "Kat".

Morassi joined the cast of Seven Network soap opera Home and Away in 2017 as Maggie Astoni. She departed in July 2020, along with Rohan Nichol who plays her on-screen husband Ben Astoni.

In 2020 Morassi returned to the big screen in paranormal horror Surrogate along side Jane Badler. Morassi plays Natalie Paxton, a nurse and single mother, who falls mysteriously ill and struggles to save her family from being destroyed. Surrogate is being released internationally in September 2022.

Filmography

Film

Television

References

External links

Australian people of Italian descent
Australian film actresses
Australian television actresses
Living people
Actresses from Adelaide
21st-century Australian actresses
1978 births